Kenny G is the debut studio album by American jazz saxophonist Kenny G, released in 1982 by Arista Records. It reached number 10 on the Billboard Jazz Albums chart.

Track listing 
"Mercy, Mercy, Mercy" – 3:41 (Joe Zawinul)
"Here We Are" (lead vocals: Greg Walker) – 4:15 (Jeff Lorber, Marlon McCain)
"Stop and Go" – 3:31 (Stevie Bensusen, Joe Ericksen, Kenny G, Jeff Lorber)
"I Can't Tell You Why" – 4:12  (Glenn Frey, Don Henley, Timothy B. Schmit)
"The Shuffle" – 4:24 (Kenny G, Jeff Lorber)
"Tell Me" – 5:52 (Kenny G, Jeff Lorber)
"Find a Way" – 4:34 (Joe Ericksen, Kenny G, Jeff Lorber)
"Crystal Mountain" – 0:39 (Kenny G)
"Come Close" – 2:54 (David Chesky)

Personnel 
 Kenny G – saxophones (soprano, alto and tenor), alto flute, Lyricon, keyboards, synthesizers
 Jeff Lorber – arrangements, keyboards, LinnDrum programming (5)
 Marlon McClain – guitars
 Neil Stubenhaus – bass (1, 2, 4, 9)
 Jimmy Haslip – bass (3, 6, 7)
 John "J.R." Robinson – drums
 Steve Forman – percussion
 Kim Hutchcroft – baritone saxophone
 Meco Monardo – trombone, trumpet, arrangements
 Steve Madaio – trumpet
 Greg Walker – lead vocals (2)

Production 
 Produced by Jeff Lorber and Meco Monardo
 Engineered and Mixed by Chris Brunt
 Assistant Engineers – Dennis Hansen and Rick McMillen
 Recorded at Indigo Ranch Studio (Malibu, CA).
 Mastered by Ken Perry
 Art Direction and Design – Ria Lewerke
 Photography – Aaron Rapoport
 Lettering – Sue Reilly

References 

1982 debut albums
Arista Records albums
Kenny G albums